Mutu Paratene Kapa  (1870 – 10 November 1968) was a New Zealand tribal leader, orator, sportsman, and Anglican priest. Of Māori descent, he identified with the Te Aupōuri and Waikato iwi. He was born in Ohinepu, Waikato, New Zealand, in 1870.

In the 1964 Queen's Birthday Honours, Kapa was appointed a Member of the Order of the British Empire, for services to the Māori people.

Biography 
Kapa was born at Ōhinepū, Te Kōpua to parents Waimārama Pene Ruruanga and Paratene Kātene Kapa. Hi father worked as a farmer and had been one of the first Māori missionaries in the Tai Tokerau area. Kapa was very athletic in his youth and played numerous sports, including rowing, rugby, football, hockey, tennis and wood-chopping. He excelled in rowing and rugby, making it as an All Black trialist in 1905.

The history of the Anglican church in the area as well as encouragement from his family led to him to pursue the ministry. He was educated at  Te Rau Theological College, Gisborne, and was ordained a deacon in 1907 and became a priest in 1911.

Kapa died in November 1968. His tangihanga was held at Te Puea Memorial Marae, and he was buried at the St James Anglican Church in Māngere Bridge, Auckland.

References 

1870 births
1968 deaths
New Zealand Māori sportspeople
New Zealand Anglican priests
People from Waikato
Te Aupōuri people
Waikato Tainui people
New Zealand Māori religious leaders
New Zealand Members of the Order of the British Empire